The 2015–16 season was the club's second season in the Scottish Premiership, having been promoted from the Scottish Championship at the end of the 2013–14 season. Hamilton Academical also competed in the League Cup and the Scottish Cup.

Results and fixtures

Scottish Premiership

Scottish League Cup

Scottish Cup

Squad statistics
During the 2015–16 season, Hamilton Academical have used thirty different players in competitive games. The table below shows the number of appearances and goals scored by each player. Ziggy Gordon started all 40 matches.

Appearances

 

|}

Team statistics

League table

Division summary

Management statistics

Transfers

In

Out

Notes

References

Hamilton Academical F.C. seasons
Hamilton Academical